Jukot used to be a VDC in Bajura District. Now it is the part of Swamikartik Rural Municipality of Sudurpashchim Province, Nepal.

Now Jukot VDC is ward no. 3 of Swamikartik Rural Municipality. This VDC has 597 household with population of 3,230 of which 1,617 are female and 1,613 are male.

People residing here belongs to Chhetri, Kami, Brahmin, Damai, Sarki, Limbu etc. It is one of the remote place of Bajura District.

Populated places in Bajura District
Village development committees (Nepal)